IS-100 can refer to:

 The  Soviet IS-2 heavy tank
 The introductory-level course on the Incident Command System, also known as I-100.